George Hart may refer to:
 George Hart (physicist) (fl. late 20th century), American physicist
 George Hart (politician) (1820–1895), New Zealand politician representing the Coleridge electorate
 George Hart (rugby union) (1909–1944), New Zealand rugby union player
 George Luzerne Hart Jr. (1905–1984), United States federal judge
 George L. Hart (born 1945), American linguist and academic
 George W. Hart (born 1955), American mathematician, programmer, and sculptor
 George D. Hart (1846–1932), Massachusetts politician
 Pop Hart (George Overbury Hart, 1868–1933), American watercolorist
 George Vaughan Hart (British Army officer) (1752–1832), British Army officer and politician
 George Z. Hart (1924–2013), American politician
 George Hart (cricketer) (1902–1987), English cricketer
 George Vaughan Hart (academic) (1841–1912), Anglo-Irish academic
 George Hart (Egyptologist) (1945–2021), British Egyptologist